Turbonilla gitaena is a species of sea snail, a marine gastropod mollusk in the family Pyramidellidae, the pyrams and their allies.

Description
The shell grows to a length of 4.2 mm.

Distribution
This species occurs in the Atlantic Ocean in the bathyal zone off the Azores.

References

External links
 To Biodiversity Heritage Library (1 publication)
 To CLEMAM
 To Encyclopedia of Life
 To World Register of Marine Species

gitaena
Gastropods described in 1897